Mary Dixon Kies (March 21, 1752 – 1837) was an American inventor. On May 5, 1809, her patent for a new technique of weaving straw with silk and thread to make hats was signed by President James Madison.

Some sources say she was the first woman to receive a US Patent, however other sources cite Hannah Slater in 1793, or  Hazel Irwin, in 1808, as the first.

Biography

Family life
Mary's father, John Dixon, was a farmer born in 1679 in Ulster, Ireland. Her mother, Janet Kennedy, was John Dixon's third wife. They had married in Voluntown, Connecticut on August 7, 1741.

Mary Dixon was born in Killingly, Connecticut on March 21, 1752. She married Isaac Pike I, and in 1770 they had a son, Isaac Pike II. After his death she married John Kies (1750–1813) who died on August 18, 1813, at age 63. She then lived with her second son, Daniel Kies, in Brooklyn, New York, until her death at age 85 in 1837.

Career
Because of the Napoleonic Wars, the United States had embargoed all trade with France and Great Britain, creating a need for American-made hats to replace European millinery. The straw-weaving industry filled the gap, with over $500,000 ($9 million in today's money) worth of straw bonnets produced in Massachusetts alone in 1810.

Mary Kies was not the first American woman to innovate in hat-making. In 1798, New Englander Betsy Metcalf invented a method of braiding straw. Her method became very popular, and she employed many women and girls to make her hats. The method created a new industry for girls and women because the straw bonnets could be made at home from local resources, so the women and girls could do work for themselves. Thus, Betsy Metcalf started the American straw-hat industry. Under the Patent Act of 1790 she could have sought a patent, but like most women at the time, who could not legally hold property, she chose not to.  Mary Kies, however, broke that pattern on May 5, 1809. Dolley Madison was so pleased by Kies' innovation that she sent a personal letter applauding her.

Invention
In the 18th-century straw hats were very popular amongst women, along with people who did work in the sun, such as field work, as they wore them to have protection from the sun. These hats were mostly imported from Europe until Mary Kies penetrated the market with her invention. Her innovative way of weaving straws with silk to create these hats was so revolutionary for the time as the hats she produced with it were sturdier, as her method of using silk instead of straws in the seam held the cross-hatching together. Also, the hat-making method she introduced was highly cost-effective, thus a lot of businesses in the hat-manufacturing market adopted it , after her patent was sadly burned in the fire of the Patent Office in 1836.

Economy
Mary Dixon Kies, with her invention, managed to help remarkably New Englands’ economy, in which she was situated and sold her designs. At that time there was a big setback for the economy from the ban of imported products from Europe. For this contribution, Kies was praised in a public manner by the then First Lady Dolly Madison, wife of President James Madison. At this time there were conflicts going on between Napoleon and some European countries, so President Madison was trying to avoid getting the US involved and thus made an effort to cut imports and make American businesses, such as Kies hat making business, thrive. 
Even after the start of World War 1 in 1812, the hat industry was one that predominated.  Even though there was an estimated profit of $500,00 (now worth $ 4.7 million) made from straw hat manufacturing, Mary Dixon Kies made a profit that was close to nothing from her inventions and sales.

Patents: being the first woman to receive one in the US
One fact about this innovator that is not as widely discussed as her inventions is that she was the first woman to receive a patent in the US, in May 5, 1809. Even though the Patent Act of 1790 allowed women to use a patent on their inventions, it was illegal for women to own property in many states. This ended up forcing women to either not place a patent on their inventions at all or place it under their husbands’ names, and consequently their husbands getting all the praise for their inventions. Mary Kies decided that since she her invention of the method of weaving straw with silk  was so successful that she would patent it in order to have all the rights to this method and it wouldn’t be available to anyone else to copy and use.

Legacy
In 1965, a monument was erected in her honor in Old South Killingly Cemetery. In 2006, she was inducted into the National Inventors Hall of Fame.

References

1752 births
1837 deaths
19th-century American inventors
19th-century American businesspeople
American patent holders
American people of Irish descent
American weavers
People from Killingly, Connecticut
Women inventors
19th-century women textile artists
19th-century textile artists
18th-century women textile artists
18th-century textile artists
18th-century American women artists
19th-century American businesswomen